Amandaville is an unincorporated community in Cumberland County, Kentucky, United States.  It lies along Route 704 north-northeast of the city of Burkesville, the county seat of Cumberland County.  Its elevation is 600 feet (183 m).

References

Unincorporated communities in Cumberland County, Kentucky
Unincorporated communities in Kentucky